Osmodes omar, the obsolete white-spots, is a butterfly in the family Hesperiidae. The species was first described by Charles Swinhoe in 1916. It is found in Guinea, Sierra Leone, Liberia, Ivory Coast, Ghana, Nigeria, Cameroon, the Republic of the Congo, the Central African Republic, the northern part of the Democratic Republic of the Congo, Uganda and north-western Tanzania. The habitat consists of forests.

The larvae feed on Marantochloa cuspidata, Thalia welwitschii and Thaumatococcus daniellii.

References

Butterflies described in 1916
Erionotini
Butterflies of Africa
Taxa named by Charles Swinhoe